The 1961 Milan–San Remo was the 52nd edition of the Milan–San Remo cycle race and was held on 18 March 1961. The race started in Milan and finished in San Remo. The race was won by Raymond Poulidor.

General classification

References

1961
1961 in road cycling
1961 in Italian sport
1961 Super Prestige Pernod
March 1961 sports events in Europe